Aragon Ballroom may refer to: 

 Aragon Ballroom (Chicago), Illinois
 Aragon Ballroom (Ocean Park, Santa Monica, California), now defunct, was on Lick Pier in this district
 Aragon Ballroom (Rancho Bernardo, San Diego, California), built in 2007, at the Rancho Bernardo Inn golf resort